Pyra: Babaeng Apoy (International title: Pyra: Fire Woman) is a 2013 Philippine television drama fantasy series broadcast by GMA Network. Directed by Roderick Lindayag, it stars Thea Tolentino in the title role. It premiered on August 26, 2013 on the network's Afternoon Prime line up replacing Kakambal ni Eliana. The series concluded on November 29, 2013 with a total of 70 episodes.

Cast and characters

Lead cast
 Thea Tolentino as Pyra del Fierro-Calida

Supporting cast
 Jeric Gonzales as Jeffrey Calida
 Elle Ramirez as Cindy del Fierro
 Angelu de Leon as Merly Lucente
 Gladys Reyes as Susan del Fierro
 Ryan Eigenmann as Daniel del Fierro 
 Roxanne Guinoo as Barbara del Fierro
 Polo Ravales as Tito
 Christopher Roxas as Ramon 
 Tess Bomb as Lucinda 
 Zandra Summer as Ena
 Teejay Marquez as Beto
 Janno Gibbs as Aidan

Guest cast
 Bembol Roco as Ferman del Fierro
 DJ Durano as Cesar Lucente
 Maricel Morales as Loreta Calida
 Jenny Miller as Osang
 German Moreno as Sirko
 Rich Asuncion as Anna

Ratings
According to AGB Nielsen Philippines' Mega Manila household television ratings, the pilot episode of Pyra: Babaeng Apoy earned a 15.6% rating. While the final episode scored a 14.1% rating.

References

External links
 

2013 Philippine television series debuts
2013 Philippine television series endings
Fantaserye and telefantasya
Filipino-language television shows
GMA Network drama series
Television shows set in Metro Manila